Saleh Muhammad Swati is a Pakistani politician who has been a member of the National Assembly of Pakistan, since August 2018. Previously he was a Member of the Provincial Assembly of Khyber Pakhtunkhwa, from May 2013 to May 2018.

Education
He has received intermediate level education.

Political career

He was elected to the Provincial Assembly of Khyber Pakhtunkhwa as a candidate of Pakistan Muslim League (N) (PML-N) from Constituency PK-55 Mansehra-III in 2013 Pakistani general election. He received 28,688 votes and defeated an independent candidate, Shahzada Gustasap Khan.

He was elected to the National Assembly of Pakistan as an independent candidate from NA-13 (Mansehra-I) with support from PTI in 2018 Pakistani general election. He received 109,282 votes and defeated PML-N candidate Shahjahan Yousuf. Following the election, he announced to join Pakistan Tehreek-e-Insaf (PTI).

References

‏More
Swati

Living people
Khyber Pakhtunkhwa MPAs 2013–2018
Pakistan Tehreek-e-Insaf MNAs
Pakistani MNAs 2018–2023
Year of birth missing (living people)